Wang Fu (ca. 1362–1416) was a Chinese landscape painter, calligrapher, and poet during the Ming Dynasty (1368–1644).

Wang was born in Wuxi in the Jiangsu province. His style name was 'Mengduan' and his pseudonyms were 'Youshi, Jiulong shanren, and Aosou'. Wang's painting followed the style of Wang Meng and Ni Zan. Wang also painted ink bamboo works in a free and uninhibited style.

Notes

References
 Ci hai bian ji wei yuan hui. Ci hai . Shanghai: Shanghai ci shu chu ban she , 1979.
 Jonathan Chaves “Painter-Poet Wang Fu (1362-1416),” (essay with translations), Oriental Art, Vol. XLV, No. 4, 1999/2000.

1362 births
1416 deaths
Ming dynasty landscape painters
Ming dynasty calligraphers
Ming dynasty poets
Writers from Wuxi
Poets from Jiangsu
14th-century Chinese calligraphers
15th-century Chinese calligraphers
Painters from Wuxi